The ISTAF SuperSeries (abbreviated: ISS) was an international sepaktakraw competition organized by the International Sepaktakraw Federation (ISTAF) held for three editions from 2011 to 2015. The ISS was the only elite international Sepaktakraw tournament recognized by the ISTAF aside from the ISTAF World Cup and King's Cup. The current format involves a qualification phase through ISTAF World Cup, which usually takes place every four years, to determine which teams qualify for the tournament phase. In the tournament phase, 8 teams for men's and 6 for women's events, including the automatically qualifying host nation(s), compete for the title at venues within the host nation(s) for a week.

The tournament was held in a grand prix format, whereby national teams compete in a series of tournaments during a season. The first season features fours tournaments which were was organized between September 2011 to July 2012 in Bangkok, Palembang, and Singapore. The second and the third seasons also consisted of four tournaments, in which Thailand has won most of the first place in both men's and women's tournaments.

There was an attempt from the ISTAF to conduct the fourth season within 2016. Nonetheless, the tournament was terminated for undisclosed reasons.

ISTAF SuperSeries Summary

Tournament Format
Matches are played using a best of three formats, where teams compete to win two sets. Once one team wins two sets, the remaining sets (if any) are discarded. If any team wins the first two sets, it wins the match, and the remaining one set is not played.

The first round, or group stage, features 8 men's and 6 women's teams, respectively divided into groups of 4 and 3; each team playing a round-robin against every other team in their group. Based on points accumulated, the top 2 teams from each group advanced to the playoff stage, which featured two rounds of matches, each round eliminating half of the teams entering that round; namely the semifinal and final rounds. In addition, there was also a play-off to decide the fifth to eighth placings.

Tournament ranking

Note: The ranking is only measured from the latest tournament, not the all-time ranking.

Medal Tally

See also
 ISTAF World Cup
 King's Cup Sepaktakraw World Championship

References

External links 
 Sepaktakraw featured in Sport Business International magazine issue no. 205 "The Ultra Fast Game You Need to See to Believe"

 
Sepak takraw competitions
Recurring sporting events established in 2011